Thongpao Tongkumnerd (born 2 January 1987) also widely known by his stage name Namo  Tongkumnerd is a Thai actor and director. Known for starring in many horror-thriller movies and TV series in the same genre.

Early life
Tongkumnerd was born in Chumphon in the south of Thailand. He entered the showbiz in 2005 as a model for youth magazines and featured in TV commercials. Later, he signed with Five Star Production thus becoming a full performer.

Partal filmography

Film
As actor
Art of the Devil (2004)
 Art of the Devil 2 (2005) 
Alone (2007)
The Screen at Kamchanod (2007)
Art of the Devil 3 (2008)
Miss You Again (2009)
Sawasdee Bangkok (Charming Bangkok) (segment Phi Makham; 2010)
Boonchu 10 (2010)
The HZ Comedians (2011)
Dark Flight (2012)
4 Kings (15 minutes short film; 2014)
Ghost Coins (2015)
Khun Phan (2016)

TV series
The Legend of King Naresuan: The Series - Hongsawadee's Hostage (2017)
Bangkok Ghost Stories (ep House, No. 10; 2018)
As director
Khon kham dan (2010; short film — received the runner-up award at the Film Expo Asia 2010)

Notes

References

External links 
 

Namo Tongkumnerd
Namo Tongkumnerd
Namo Tongkumnerd
Namo Tongkumnerd
Namo Tongkumnerd
Namo Tongkumnerd
1987 births
Living people